Big Dreams in a Small Town is the third studio album by American country music group Restless Heart. It was released by RCA Nashville in July 1988. The songs:"The Bluest Eyes in Texas," the title track "A Tender Lie," and "Say What's in Your Heart" were all released as singles prior to the album.

The album reached number 4 on the Top Country Albums chart and has been certified Gold by the RIAA.

Track listing

Personnel 

Restless Heart
 John Dittrich – drums, vocals
 Paul Gregg – bass, vocals
 Dave Innis – keyboards, vocals
 Greg Jennings – guitars, vocals
 Larry Stewart – vocals

Lead vocals on all tracks by Larry Stewart, except "Carved in Stone" (Paul Gregg and Larry Stewart), "El Dorado" (Paul Gregg), and "Calm Before the Storm" (John Dittrich).

Additional musicians
 Carl Marsh – Fairlight programming
 David Humphreys – Fairlight programming

Production 
 Restless Heart – producers
 Tim DuBois – producer 
 Scott Hendricks – producer, recording, mixing, mastering 
 Joe Galante – A&R direction 
 J. T. Cantwell – assistant engineer 
 Chris Hammond – assistant engineer 
 Mark Nevers – assistant engineer
 Eric Paul – assistant engineer 
 Tom Singers – assistant engineer
 Carry Summers – assistant engineer 
 Bill Whittington – assistant engineer 
 Carlos Grier – digital editing
 Denny Purcell – mastering 
 Mary Hamilton – art direction 
 Bob McConnell – design 
 Empire Studios – photography
 Mixed at The Castle (Franklin, TN).
 Mastered at Georgetown Masters (Nashville, TN).

Charts

Weekly charts

Year-end charts

References 

1988 albums
Restless Heart albums
RCA Records albums
Albums produced by Scott Hendricks